Vanity Fair is a 1922 British silent drama film directed by Walter Courtney Rowden and starring Clive Brook, Cosmo Kyrle Bellew and Douglas Munro. An adaptation of the 1848 novel Vanity Fair by William Makepeace Thackeray, it was made as part of the "Tense Moments with Great Authors Series" of films.

Partial cast
 Clive Brook - Rawdon Crawley 
 Douglas Munro - Marquis of Staines 
 Henry Doughty - Mr. Wenham 
 Kyrle Bellew - Becky Sharp

References

External links
 

1922 films
British historical drama films
Films directed by Walter Courtney Rowden
1920s historical drama films
Films based on Vanity Fair (novel)
British silent short films
British black-and-white films
1922 drama films
1920s English-language films
1920s British films
Silent drama films